City Pier or variants may refer to:
 City Pier A, a municipal pier in the Hudson River at Battery Park near the southern end of Manhattan in New York City
 London Bridge City Pier (also known as "City Pier"), the main pier for the City of London and City Hall
 Kowloon City Ferry Pier
 City Hall Ferry Pier, a now-relocated barge pier at the east of ex-Queen's Pier outside Hong Kong City Hall